Meet Bill (formerly known as Bill) is a 2007 American comedy film written and directed by Bernie Goldmann and Melisa Wallack, and stars Aaron Eckhart as the title character, with supporting performances by Logan Lerman, Jessica Alba, Elizabeth Banks and Timothy Olyphant.

Plot 

Bill  is a dissatisfied, middle-aged man, working at his father-in-law, Mr. Jacoby's bank, and no one takes him seriously. Struggling with body image issues, he stashes candy in his home and office. Jacoby, a pillar in the community, is considering a mayoral run. Bill and wife Jess live in a house provided by her father and are financially comfortable.

Bill tries to purchase a doughnut franchise through the Whitmans, to wean himself and his wife off Jacoby's finances.

At the family's public donation ceremony, Bill meets "the Kid", a teen he protects from the school principal for possession of marijuana. In the hall, the principal suggests a school mentoring program, Seeing Jess talking with newscaster Chip Johnson, 
he's mildly suspicious. He puts a hidden camera in the bedroom, and goes on a work-related hunting trip. After seeing the video confirming Jess' affair with Chip, in a rage, Bill bursts onto Chip's live broadcast, beats him up, and is arrested.

After the sex tape has been viewed by the police, it circulates the bank and local community, furthering Bill and Jess' embarrassment. Fearing it could ruin her father's mayoral bid, she tries to conceal the affair and the video from him.

Bill's successful older brother Sargeant bails him out of jail, and he stays at his place with his husband Paul. Fighting about the sex tape with his wife, they go to Chip's. After he is rude to Jess, Bill beats him up again, it's again broadcast on TV, and Bill is labeled Chip's "deranged fan." Random people frequently yell "Apologize!" at Bill throughout the film, a referring to him punching Chip while yelling "Apologize!" on the air.

Taking up swimming again helps Bill clear his mind, and he continues mentoring the Kid, who admires him. A plan is devised to win back Bill's wife. Lingerie salesgirl Lucy, flirts with Bill to make Jess jealous. Meanwhile, still trying to get the doughnut franchise, as the owners want to meet Jess as co-partner, Lucy acts as his wife.

Getting his life back, Bill is cutting out sweets, losing weight, swimming daily, mentoring the Kid, and trying to win back Jess. At a family dinner, he volunteers to buy fireworks for the picnic where Jacoby will announce his mayoral bid. After a fun-filled day, Bill, the Kid, Lucy, and her friend go back to his tent in his brother's back yard, where he gets high and has sex with Lucy's friend.

At the golf course picnic, Bill gets too close to his wife and Chip, re the restraining order, so security throws him out. Bill tells the Kid to meet him at the back, but while driving there, he crashes, causing the fireworks to explode early. The Kid rescues him on a golf cart, takes him to the hospital, where Jess shows up, and tells him she knows about the franchise. Discussing their marriage, Bill reveals his unhappiness and dislike of their dependence on her father's money saying "our lives suck."

Bill decides to take charge of his life. Staring at himself in a mirror. seeing what he has become, he cuts off his hair and changes his wardrobe. He later visits Jacoby at his office, resigning, pointing out that he doesn't fit in. His father-in-law understands, accepting his resignation, commending Bill for attacking Chip, saying he would have done the same. Despite Jess's attempt to conceal it, Jacoby knew about her affair.

When Bill meets with the Whitmans he is surprised to see Jess. She convinces them to let them buy the franchise. During a private conversation, Bill confesses he was going to call it off. Having a change of heart, he lets the purchase go through, and gives it to her. They make peace, agreeing to separate, putting the house up for sale.

At the Kid's school, Bill bids him farewell, excited to start a new, unknown chapter in his life. He promises to keep in touch, telling him to look in his locker which explodes with fireworks, to his delight.

Cast 
 Aaron Eckhart as Bill Anderson
 Jessica Alba as Lucy
 Elizabeth Banks as Jess
 Logan Lerman as The Kid
 Holmes Osborne as Mr. Jacoby
 Todd Louiso as John Jr.
 Timothy Olyphant as Chip Johnson
 Craig Bierko as Sargeant Anderson (uncredited)
 Reed Diamond as Paul
 Kristen Wiig as Jane Whitman
 Jason Sudeikis as Jim Whitman
 Andy Zou as Donald Choo
 Ana Mackenzie as Sarah Sheldon (credited as Ana Lucasey)
 Gabriel Basso as Kid with Cancer

Production 
The film was shot in St. Louis, Missouri from June 11 - July 20, 2006; the school scenes of the film were shot at Mary Institute and St. Louis Country Day School (MICDS) and additional scenes were filmed at Washington University in St. Louis. Scenes were also shot at: the Oberweis Dairy in Oakville, Missouri, in Dick's Sporting Goods store at West County Mall, in Des Peres, Missouri, at the Saint Louis Galleria in Richmond Heights, Missouri, and an exterior scene at Molly Brown's Fireworks in Pacific, Missouri. KPLR-TV, a St. Louis television station, is the station that Chip Johnson works for, and movie co-anchor Rick Edlund was an anchor on the station in real life. Filming for several scenes took place at St. Albans Country Club in St. Albans, Missouri. Additionally, some scenes were shot at Bellerive Country Club in Town and Country, Missouri. Although shot in the St. Louis area, the setting of the movie is Minnesota, as indicated by the license plates of vehicles, and a "Twin Cities Realty" for-sale sign.

Re-shoots and additional scenes were shot in Los Angeles, California, after major production had finished.

Release 
The film officially premiered on September 8, 2007, at the Toronto International Film Festival and was immediately picked up for distribution. It was released in limited engagement on April 4, 2008, in St. Louis and Minneapolis, with a wider release in 36 theaters on May 9, 2008.

Reception 
 
On Rotten Tomatoes, the film has an approval rating of 20% based on reviews from 20 critics, with an average rating of 3.84/10. On Metacritic it has a score of 30% based on reviews from 8 critics, indicating "generally unfavorable reviews".

Michael Rechtshaffen of The Hollywood Reporter wrote: "After a promising start, this quirky comedy falls flat despite Eckhart's best efforts."
Eddie Cockrell of Variety called it "A labored screwball comedy about disenchanted people of privilege yearning for fulfillment, pic is full of leaden hijinx directed and played with all the subtlety of a myocardial infarction."

References

External links
 
 
 
 
 
 

2007 films
2007 comedy-drama films
American comedy-drama films
Films scored by Edward Shearmur
Films shot in Missouri
Films shot in St. Louis
2007 comedy films
2007 drama films
2000s English-language films
2000s American films